The 2012–13 season will be Swindon Town's first season in the League One since 2010–11. Swindon will seek to achieve back-to-back promotions after winning promotion from League Two. The club will also compete in the FA Cup, League Cup and the Football League Trophy.

Chronological list of events

6 October 2012: The club are placed under a Football League transfer embargo for breaking limits on wages and transfer fees.
15 October 2012: Jeremy Wray is replaced by former British diplomat Sir William Patey as chairman.
6 November 2012: The transfer embargo is lifted by the Football League.
3 January 2013: Sir William Patey tells the BBC that no money will be available for transfers.
5 January 2013: Paolo Di Canio offers to spend between £20,000-£30,000 of his own money to keep his loan players at the club.
12 January 2013: Swindon Town officially back the Football Supporters' Federation's 'Safe Standing' campaign after a poll conducted by fan website, 'The Washbag', shows overwhelming support in favour of the return of stadia terracing.
13 January 2013: On-loan midfielder John Bostock returns to Tottenham Hotspur.
16 January 2013: Majority shareholder Andrew Black confirms that he is actively trying to sell the club.
20 January 2013: Paolo Di Canio, club staff and supporters successfully rally together to clear snow from the County Ground pitch ahead of the League One fixture with Shrewsbury Town.
22 January 2013: Swindon Town accept an apology from The League Paper after staff writer, Chris Dunlavy, suggested the club committed "financial doping" and "virtually cheated" their way to the League Two title during the 2011/12 season.
25 January 2013: Chairman Sir William Patey announces that he will quit once the takeover of the club is completed.
30 January 2013: The club announce that an agreement had been made to sell the Swindon Town to a consortium fronted by businessman Jed McCrory. The takeover is subject to Football League approval.
30 January 2013: Matt Ritchie joins Bournemouth for £500,000. Swindon Town state that the transfer was a necessity as the club try and avoid administration.
31 January 2013: The loan-to-permanent transfer of Cheltenham Town midfielder Marlon Pack along with loan deals for Charlton Athletic duo Bradley Wright-Phillips and Danny Green are blocked by the Football League, who refuse to ratify the deals before the takeover of the club is approved.
1 February 2013: Paolo Di Canio releases a statement announcing that he is considering his future with the club.
1 February 2013: The Board release a statement to assure supporters that work is continuing to secure the sale of the club and responds to Paolo Di Canio's statement by reiterating the Italian manager still has the support of the club.
18 February 2013: Paolo Di Canio resigns.
19 February 2013: Fabrizio Piccareta is caretaker manager for the 3–1 victory at Tranmere Rovers. However, Di Canio's former assistant resigns shortly afterwards.
20 February 2013: Senior players Tommy Miller & Darren Ward are appointed co-caretaker managers.
21 February 2013: Jed McCrory's consortium take full control of the club.
21 February 2013: Swindon Town legend Fraser Digby is appointed interim goalkeeper coach as a temporary replacement for Domenico Doardo who resigned days before.
21 February 2013: It was reported that on the night of 20 February, Paolo Di Canio had carried out a raid on his old Swindon Town office and had torn down pictures of his time as manager.
21/22 February 2013: Majority shareholder Andrew Black uses social network website Twitter to explain his decision to sell the club.
22 February 2013: Exiled midfielder Luke Rooney returns to the first team set-up.
22 February 2013: Michael Peacock is appointed interim fitness & conditioning coach.
28 February 2013: Kevin MacDonald is appointed manager.
6 March 2013: Chief Executive Nick Watkins leaves the club.
28 March 2013: The Football League lift transfer embargo.

League data

Sponsors 

|}

Pre-Season 
During the final stages of the 2011/12 season Swindon Town confirmed two pre-season friendlies, the first confirmed fixture was a home tie against Championship side Crystal Palace (8 August). Shortly afterwards the club announced that a local friendly with fellow Wiltshire outfit Salisbury City was confirmed to take place at the Raymond McEnhill Stadium on 3 August.

In June 2012, it was announced that the club would be spending two weeks of pre-season training in Italy between Sunday 1st – Saturday 14 July. The team based themselves close to Bardolino near Lake Garda. It was later confirmed that Swindon would play a local Select XI consisting on Serie D standard players and Bayern Munich II. An away fixture against Non-League side Weston-super-Mare was later confirmed.

Results

League One
The fixture list for the 2012/13 season was announced on 18 June 2012. It was confirmed that Swindon would begin their campaign with an away fixture at Hartlepool United.

August

September

October

November

December

January

February

March

April

May

League Cup

Results

Football League Trophy

Results

F.A. Cup

Results

Club information

Andrew Black Era (up until 21 February 2013)

Jed McCrory Era (from 21 February 2013)

Manager Season Stats
As of 1 May 2013. Only competitive matches for the 2012/13 season are counted

Squad Details

Appearances and goals

|-
|colspan="14"|Players who are contracted to Swindon Town but are currently out on loan:

|-
|colspan="14"|Players who were contracted to Swindon Town but have since departed on a permanent basis:

|}

Captains
Accounts for all competitions. Last updated on 1 May 2013.

Goalscorers 
Accounts for all competitions. Last updated on 1 May 2013.

Hat-tricks
Includes all competitive matches.
{| class="wikitable" style="font-size: 95%; text-align: center;"
|-
!width=15|
!width=15|
!width=15|
!width=15|
!width=150|Name
!width=150|Competition
!width=200|Opposition
!width=200|Goals
!width=100|Final Score
|-
|1
|9
|FW
|
|James Collins
|Capital One Cup
|vs. Stoke City (28/08/12)
|  
|4–3 WIN
|-
|2
|9
|FW
|
|James Collins
|League One
|vs. Portsmouth (1/1/13)
|   
|5–0 WIN
|-

Penalties awarded
Includes all competitive matches.

{| class="wikitable" style="font-size: 95%; text-align: center;"
|-
!width=15|
!width=15|
!width=15|
!width=15|
!width=150|Name
!width=150|Competition
!width=200|Opposition
!width=50|Success
!width=100|Final Score
|-
|1
|18
|MF
|
|Tommy Miller
|League One
|vs. Hartlepool United (18/08/12)
|
|0–0 TIE
|-
|2
|18
|MF
|
|Tommy Miller
|League One
|vs. Stevenage (27/10/12)
|
|4–0 WIN
|-
|3
|16
|FW
|
|Andy Williams
|League One
|vs. Tranmere Rovers (21/12/12)
|
|5–0 WIN
|-
|4
|24
|FW
|
|Chris Martin
|League One
|vs. Shrewsbury Town (19/01/13)
|
|2–0 WIN
|-
|5
|28
|FW
|
|Adam Rooney
|League One
|vs. Crawley Town (02/02/13)
|
|1–1 TIE
|-
|6
|28
|FW
|
|Adam Rooney
|League One
|vs. Yeovil Town (19/03/13)
|
|1–0 WIN
|-

Clean sheets
Includes all competitive matches.

{| class="wikitable" style="font-size: 95%; text-align: center;"
|-
!width=15|
!width=15|
!width=15|
!width=15|
!width=150|Name
!width=80|League One
!width=80|FA Cup
!width=80|League Cup
!width=80|JP Trophy
!width=80|Total
|-
|1
|1
|GK
|
| Wes Foderingham
|19
|0
|1
|0
|20
|-
|colspan="4"|
|TOTALS
|19
|0
|1
|0
|20

Disciplinary

Suspensions

Monthly & Weekly Awards

Transfers

Trial players

Development Squad
In June 2011 it was announced that Swindon Town would not compete in a Reserve League for the 2011/12 season and would therefore arrange friendlies with other clubs. This decision remained in place for the following season.

Development Squad Results

References 

2012-13
2012–13 Football League One by team